The Pittcon Heritage Award  recognizes "outstanding individuals whose entrepreneurial careers shaped the instrumentation and laboratory supplies community." The award  is jointly sponsored by the Pittsburgh Conference on Analytical Chemistry and Applied Spectroscopy (Pittcon) and the Science History Institute (formerly the Chemical Heritage Foundation). The award is presented annually at a special ceremony during Pittcon.

Recipients 
The award is given yearly and was first presented in 2002.

 2020 Stan Stearns, founder and director of research of VICI Valco Instruments and related companies
 2019 Nicholas Pelick and Walter Supina,, Supelco
 2018 Michael Morris, SpectrEcology and Ocean Optics
 2017 Robert J. Warren, LECO
 2016 Kenji Kazato and Kazuo Ito, JEOL
 2015 A. Blaine Bowman, Dionex (later acquired by Thermo Fisher Scientific)
 2014 Lynwood W. Swanson,  FEI Company, USA
 2013 Günther Laukien, Bruker Physik AG, Germany; (Bruker Corporation), USA
 2012 Genzo Shimadzu, Sr., and Genzo Shimadzu, Jr., Shimadzu Corporation, Japan
 2011 George Hatsopoulos, John Hatsopoulos, and Arvin Smith, Thermo Electron, USA
 2010 Walter Jennings, University of California, Davis, J&W Scientific, USA
 2009 Alfred R. Bader, Aldrich Chemical Company (Sigma-Aldrich Corporation), USA
 2008 Leroy Hood, Institute for Systems Biology, USA
 2007 David Schwartz, Bio-Rad Laboratories, USA
 2006 Masao Horiba, Horiba,  Japan
 2005 Robert W. Allington, Instrumentation Specialties Co. (Teledyne ISCO), USA
 2004 Paul A. Wilks, Jr., Wilks Enterprises, USA
 2003 Kathryn Hach-Darrow, Hach Company, USA
 2002 David Nelson, Nelson Analytical Systems, USA

Photo gallery

See also

 List of chemistry awards

References

American awards